The Old Schools are part of the University of Cambridge, in the centre of Cambridge, England. The Old Schools house the Cambridge University Offices, which form the main administration for the University.

The building is Grade I listed. It is two storeys high with ashlar facing and a parapet above. Within the Old Schools are West Court and Cobble Court.

The Old Schools building is located at the end of Trinity Lane and is surrounded by other historic University and College buildings. To the north is Gonville and Caius College.
To the east is the University of Cambridge Senate House where degree ceremonies are held, on King's Parade. To the south, the scene is dominated by the large King's College Chapel. To the west are Trinity Hall and Clare College.

The Old Schools Site covers the Old Schools, the Senate House, and Great St Mary's, the University Church.

History 
The original building was begun in 1441–4. It formed the Old Court of King's College, but was bought by University and partly demolished in 1829. The west range was completed
in 1864–7 by Sir George Gilbert Scott and in 1889–90 by John Loughborough Pearson.
The Old Schools formerly housed the Cambridge University Library, which has now relocated to the west of the Cambridge city centre, north off West Road Path. The north wing designed by Charles Robert Cockerell and built 1836-7 in a grand classical style was originally part of a scheme to rebuild the entire building.

References 

Buildings and structures of the University of Cambridge
George Gilbert Scott buildings
History of Cambridge
University of Cambridge sites